John Edmund Greene DFC (2 July 1894 – 14 October 1918) was a Canadian First World War flying ace, officially credited with 15 victories. Greene was shot down by Carl Degelow on 4 October 1918, but survived to be shot down and killed 10 days later.

References

Canadian military personnel killed in World War I
Canadian World War I flying aces
Recipients of the Distinguished Flying Cross (United Kingdom)
1894 births
1918 deaths
Canadian military personnel from Manitoba